Buttersville, Michigan was a village in Mason County, Michigan near Ludington.  It was established in 1880 as a sawmill company town.  The Mason and Oceana Railroad, which brought logs to the mill, was built in 1886 and used Buttersville as its northwestern terminus.  Buttersville had a post office until 1907.

Sources
Walter Romig, Michigan Place Names, p. 91.

Populated places established in 1880
Populated places in Mason County, Michigan
1880 establishments in Michigan